Joseph Alexandre Hubert Marcoux (February 12, 1941 –  November 9, 2009) was a French-Canadian solo sailor, author, public speaker, and travel writer. He sailed solo around the world for 18 years, completing his circumnavigation trip in Halifax, Nova Scotia.

Born and raised in Charlo, New Brunswick, Marcoux attended multiple universities and graduated with a bachelor's degree. After completing his international journey, he began writing a novel and speaking at conferences about his voyage. In November 2009, Marcoux left Eastern Passage and disappeared during his trip from Nova Scotia to Bermuda.

Education and career 
Marcoux studied commerce at the Université de Moncton, Sir George Williams University, and finally the Concordia University where he earned his Bachelor of Commerce degree. He founded and sold his two successful Montreal businesses, both being manufacturing companies. The first business was a manufacturer of flight suits and the second was a manufacturer of picture frames.

World-wide voyage 
In August 1981, Marcoux purchased the vessel named Jonathan in Daytona Beach, Florida. Later in 2003, he successfully completed an 18-year world sailing circumnavigation with a solo trip from Australia to Halifax.

Return 
After his 18-year travel, Marcoux returned to live with his sister in Bedford, Nova Scotia. His boat, Mon Pays, was wrecked during Hurricane Juan. To pay for his boat repairs, Marcoux began writing his first novel, which was about his 18-year-long journey. It was titled Around the World in 18 years and after its publishing, he began speaking at conferences and writing for trade magazines. In November 2009, he left Eastern Passage and became missing on his voyage from Nova Scotia to Bermuda.

Lost at sea 
Sailing solo on his boat the Mon Pays, Marcoux left the Eastern Passage on November 9, 2009. He had planned on arriving in Bermuda on November 16. When he didn't arrive, a search was conducted by Canadian and U.S. aircraft.

Members of the Air National Guard (ANG) later joined the search. They spent three days scouring the ocean between Virginia and Bermuda. Fixed wing planes were covering 323,000 nautical square miles in the search for the experienced sailor.

Marcoux's craft was reported to have a VHF radio, personal flotation devices, flares and a dinghy. On November 22, the search was scaled back. During this time, there was still hope in finding Marcoux. Officials noted that he likely encountered a series of storms with winds gusts of more than 110 kilometers an hour and waves measuring 10 meters in height during his trip. Shortly after the scale back, with no sightings reported, the search was officially halted.

Later reports 
From Marcoux's disappearance until 2010, many newspapers received criticism after reporting his loss as "preventable". Feedback from the public noted that any disapproval of the journey was "not necessarily ours to say".

Mon Pays 
Mon Pays was a Compu-Craft Yacht Design Dimensions boat, LOA 46'. This was the craft that was lost at sea during a nor'easter in the Atlantic.

Works 
Around the World in 18 Years

See also 
 List of people who disappeared mysteriously at sea
 List of people from Restigouche County, New Brunswick

References 

1941 births
2000s missing person cases
2009 deaths
20th-century Canadian male writers
20th-century Canadian non-fiction writers
Canadian male non-fiction writers
Canadian sailors
Canadian travel writers
Concordia University alumni
Missing person cases in Canada
People from Restigouche County, New Brunswick
Sir George Williams University alumni
Université de Moncton alumni
Writers from New Brunswick